The Association of Mirecourt Country communes (French: Communauté de communes du Pays de Mirecourt) is a former administrative association of communes in the Vosges département of eastern France and in the region of Lorraine. It was created in January 2014 and had its administrative offices at Juvaincourt. It was merged into the new Communauté de communes de Mirecourt Dompaire in January 2017.

The Communauté de communes du Pays de Mirecourt was first created in 1997. In January 2014 it absorbed the former Communauté de communes du Xaintois and 8 other communes, forming a new association with the same name.

Composition
The Communauté de communes comprised the following communes:

 Ambacourt
 Baudricourt
 Biécourt
 Blémerey
 Boulaincourt
 Chauffecourt
 Chef-Haut
 Dombasle-en-Xaintois
 Domvallier
 Frenelle-la-Grande
 Frenelle-la-Petite
 Hymont
 Juvaincourt
 Madecourt
 Mattaincourt
 Mazirot
 Mirecourt
 Oëlleville
 Poussay
 Puzieux
 Ramecourt
 Remicourt
 Repel
 Rouvres-en-Xaintois
 Saint-Prancher
 Thiraucourt
 Totainville
 Valleroy-aux-Saules
 Villers
 Vroville

References

Mirecourt